Sadovy is a rural locality (a settlement) in Timiryazevskoye Rural Settlement of Maykopsky District, Russia. The population was 160 as of 2018. There is 1 street.

Geography 
Sadovy is located 11 km southwest of Tulsky (the district's administrative centre) by road. Shuntuk is the nearest rural locality.

References 

Rural localities in Maykopsky District